The men's decathlon event at the 2011 Summer Universiade was held on 17–18 August.

Medalists

Results

100 metres
Wind:Heat 1:  +0.1 m/s, Heat 2: +0.7 m/s, Heat 3: +0.1 m/s

Long jump

Shot put

High jump

400 metres

110 metres hurdles
Wind:Heat 1: -0.1 m/s, Heat 2: -0.4 m/s, Heat 3: -0.5 m/s

Discus throw

Pole vault

Javelin throw

1500 metres

Final standings

References
100m results
Long jump group A results
Long jump group B results
Shot put group A results
Shot put group B results
High jump group A results
High jump group B results
400m results
110m hurdles results
Discus throw group A results
Discus throw group B results
Pole vault group A results
Pole vault group B results
Javelin throw group A results
Javelin throw group B results
1500m results

Decathlon
2011